"Boy with Luv" (Korean: 작은 것들을 위한 시; RR: Jag-eun geosdeul-eul wihan si,  "A Poem for Small Things") is a song recorded by South Korean boy band BTS, featuring American singer Halsey, as the lead single for their sixth extended play Map of the Soul: Persona. It was released on April 12, 2019, by Big Hit Entertainment. The song's music video was the most viewed online music video in 24 hours at the time, garnering over 74.6 million views within its first day of release. The song was certified Platinum by the RIAA in June. "Boy with Luv" held the record for the song with the most music show wins after the 2000s in South Korea with 21 wins, until the record was broken by "Dynamite".

On July 3, 2019, the Japanese version of the song was released as a double A-side single alongside an original Japanese track titled "Lights" via Universal Music Japan.

Composition
"Boy With Luv" featuring American singer Halsey has been described as a "funk pop" song about happiness and love. It serves as a parallel track to their earlier song "Boy in Luv", released in 2014. According to Tamar Herman of Billboard, the song describes how true strength and love come from finding joy in the smallest things in life. Elias Leight from Rolling Stone classified the song as "nu-disco single". NME characterized it as "bubblegum pop". Yim Hyun-su from The Korea Herald described the lead single as "an upbeat electro-pop song with catchy hooks". According to Refinery29, the light, funk-laced song features live instruments.

Music video
A trailer for the music video was released on April 7, 2019, with a 13-second clip of the song towards the end. The teaser features Halsey working in a ticket booth before walking outside to find BTS sitting on a couch. A second teaser, featuring close-ups of the band, was released on April 10.

Directed by Yong-Seok Choi from Lumpens, the full music video was released on April 12. It simultaneously obtained the records of fastest-liked video and fastest-viewed video on YouTube, reaching 3 million likes in 2 hours and 74.6 million views within 24 hours of release, making it the most viewed YouTube video in the first 24 hours after its release at the time, averaging about 860 views per second during that interval. It was also the fastest video to reach 100 million views on YouTube, doing so in approximately one day and 10 hours. On April 26, BigHit released a second version of the music video, titled "ARMY With Luv", dedicated to the band's fandom, ARMY. The video featured footage of the band not seen in the original version and more moments with Halsey; the large "LOVE" sign that appears atop a building while the band dances in the original was replaced with one that spelt "ARMY" instead. In December 2019, YouTube named it the most viewed music video in South Korea of the year. The music video crossed 1 billion views in October 2020, eighteen months after release, and is the band's second to reach the mark.

Promotion
The band performed the song for the first time on April 13, 2019, as the musical guests on Saturday Night Live (making them the first K-Pop Group to perform on the show) and performed it with Halsey at the 2019 Billboard Music Awards held on May 1, 2019. BTS started their Korean promotion on April 18, 2019, on M Countdown. They performed the song again to kick off Good Morning Americas Summer Concert Series at New York's Central Park on May 15, 2019, along with their 2016 single, Fire. On May 16, 2019, BTS performed the song at The Late Show with Stephen Colbert. On May 21, 2019, they performed the song at The Voices finale. On May 30, 2019, they also performed the song at Britain Got Talents semi-final.

On November 30, BTS performed "Boy with Luv" at the 2019 Melon Music Awards with throwbacks to "Boy in Luv". On December 4, the song was performed at the 2019 Mnet Asian Music Awards. Two days later, BTS performed the song at the KIIS-FM Jingle Ball in Los Angeles, where they appeared as a headliner. In addition, BTS performed the song in South Korea at the SBS Gayo Daejun and KBS Song Festival on December 25 and 27, respectively, following which the song was performed in New York's Times Square at Dick Clark's New Year's Rockin' Eve.

Reception

Taylor Glasby writing for Dazed labelled "Boy With Luv" as "a beacon of pop sweetness". Dazed placed it in their list of "The 20 best K-pop songs of 2019" and commended the "catchy, made-for-radio immediacy" of the song, additionally characterizing "the playful lightness of the instrumental, vocals, and overall mood" that "bring to it a joyful ingenuousness and an old-world classiness that keeps the song sounding box fresh." Writing for the Consequence of Sound, Laura Dzubay called the song "familiarly romantic". The song was included in South China Morning Posts list of "The 10 best K-pop songs of 2019". In that article, Jeff Benjamin described it as "euphoric pop sound" while praising how the song "shows their maturity and growth and comes with a message – to allow love to take over gradually and to make changes from the inside." Rhian Daly from NME called the song "addictive and deftly balanced" with Halsey's chorus "fitting in naturally and seamlessly".Billboard included the song in their list of "The 100 Best Songs of 2019: Staff List" as well as their list of "The 25 Best K-pop Songs of 2019: Critics' Picks". NME placed the song on their list of "The 50 best songs of 2019". It was also named as the Song of the Year through the public survey conducted by Gallup Korea in 2019.

Commercial performance
Upon release, "Boy With Luv" debuted at No. 1 on the real-time charts of six major music sites including Soribada, Genie, Naver, Bugs, Mnet, and Flo on April 12. On the morning of April 13, it was reported that the song ranked No. 1 in real time charts of all digital platforms including Melon, thereby achieving an "all kill". In addition, all other tracks of Map of the Soul: Persona debuted in Top 10. It was reported that multiple servers crashed, including Korea's largest music site Melon, due to the number of fans streaming at the same time. "Boy With Luv" debuted at No. 1 on the Gaon Digital Chart and topped the weekly charts for three consecutive weeks. "Boy with Luv" debuted and peaked at No. 8 on the US Billboard Hot 100 Chart, becoming the group's highest Top 10 entry following "Fake Love". The song also debuted at No. 13 on the UK Official Singles Chart, making it the highest-charting single by a Korean act. The single also launched at No. 5 on the Billboard Streaming Songs chart, the highest rank for the band on the chart so far and the second top 10 after "Fake Love" peaked at No. 7, according to the Billboard website. It also ranked No. 3 on the Digital Song Sales chart, marking the group's fourth song hitting the chart's top 10.

"Boy with Luv" was certified Platinum by the Recording Industry Association of America (RIAA) in June, for selling over one million units in the United States. It is the group's second Platinum certification following "Mic Drop". The song surpassed 100 million streams on Gaon Music Chart, earning a Platinum certification from the Korea Music Content Association (KMCA). "Boy With Luv" was certified Gold by the Australian Recording Industry Association (ARIA) for selling 35,000 units in Australia.

BTS was named one of the Top 10 artists of 2019 by Genie Music with "Boy with Luv" topping their daily chart for 26 days.

Credits and personnel
Credits adapted from the liner notes of Map of the Soul: Persona.

 BTS – primary vocals
 Halsey – featured vocals, songwriting
 Pdogg – production, songwriting, keyboard, synthesizer, vocal arrangement, rap arrangement, recording engineer, digital editing
 RM – songwriting, rap arrangement, recording engineer
 Melanie Fontana – songwriting, chorus
 Michel "Lindgren" Schulz – songwriting, recording engineer
 "Hitman" Bang – songwriting
 Suga – songwriting

 Emily Weisband – songwriting
 J-Hope – songwriting
 Lee Tae-wook – guitar
 Jungkook – chorus
 Park Jin-se − recording engineer
 Alex Williams − recording engineer
 Adora – digital editing

Accolades

Music program awards

Charts

Weekly charts

Year-end charts

Certifications

Release history

See also
 List of most-viewed online videos in the first 24 hours
 List of M Countdown Chart winners (2019)
 List of number-one songs of 2019 (Malaysia)
 List of airplay number-one hits of the 2010s (Argentina)

References

2019 singles
2019 songs
BTS songs
Bubblegum pop songs
Funk songs
Halsey (singer) songs
Number-one singles in Malaysia
Macaronic songs
Music videos directed by Lumpens
Songs written by Pdogg
Songs written by Emily Weisband
Songs written by Halsey (singer)
Songs written by Melanie Fontana
Songs written by Bang Si-hyuk
Gaon Digital Chart number-one singles
Billboard Korea K-Pop number-one singles
Songs written by RM (rapper)
Songs written by J-Hope
Songs written by Suga (rapper)
Hybe Corporation singles